Kangerluluk, meaning 'the awful fjord', is a fjord in the King Frederick VI Coast, Kujalleq municipality, southern Greenland.

Deposits of rare minerals have been found in this fjord, as well as in neighbouring Igutsaat Fjord.

Geography
Kangerluluk extends in a roughly east–west direction for about 65 km between Igutsaat Fjord to the north and Iluileq Fjord (Danell Fjord) to the south. To the east the fjord opens into the North Atlantic Ocean between Cape Olfert Fischer and the headland of Qajartalik, just north of Qeqertatsiaq Island. The fjord has a large active glacier at its head and is frequently blocked by ice.

Kangerluluk has four short branches on its southern coast. On the northern shore the Syenitbugt is a bay with an islet, located about 11 km from the fjord's mouth.

Mountains
The Graah Mountains (Graah Fjelde) rise to the south of the fjord and are relatively free from snow.

Bibliography
Henrik Stendal, Robert Frei, Mike A. Hamilton, Wulf U. Mueller, The Palaeoproterozoic Kangerluluk gold–copper mineralization (southeast Greenland): Pb and Nd isotopic constraints on its timing and genesis in Mineralium Deposita, March 2001, Volume 36, Issue 2, pp 177–188

See also
List of fjords of Greenland
Syenite

References

External links
Shallow-water, eruption-fed, mafic pyroclastic deposits along a Paleoproterozoic coastline: Kangerluluk volcano-sedimentary sequence, southeast Greenland; Precambrian Research, Volume 101, Issues 2–4, June 2000, Pages 163–192
Kangerluluk prospect, Kangerluk, Kujalleq, Greenland - mindat.org

Fjords of Greenland